The 22139 / 22140 Pune - Ajni Humsafar Express is a superfast train belonging to Central Railway zone that runs between Pune Junction and Ajni of Nagpur city.

It is currently being operated with 22139/22140 train numbers on a weekly basis.

Coach Composition 

The trains is completely 3-tier AC sleeper trains designed by Indian Railways with features of LED screen display to show information about stations, train speed etc. and will have announcement system as well, Vending machines for tea, coffee and milk, Bio toilets in compartments as well as CCTV cameras.

Service

The 22139/Pune - Ajni Humsafar Express has an average speed of 58 km/hr and covers 887 km in 15h 15m.

The 22140/Ajni - Pune Humsafar Express has an average speed of 56 km/hr and covers 887 km in 15h 55m.

Route & Halts

Schedule

Traction

Both trains are hauled by Ajni based WAP 7 (HOG) equipped locomotive on its entire journey.

Rake Sharing

The train shares its rake with 11417/11418 Pune-Nagpur Humsafar Express.

See also 

 Humsafar Express
 Pune Junction railway station
 Ajni railway station

Notes

References 

Humsafar Express trains
Rail transport in Maharashtra
Transport in Pune
Transport in Nagpur
Railway services introduced in 2019